{{DISPLAYTITLE:C6H7NO}}
The molecular formula C6H7NO (molar mass: 109.13 g/mol) may refer to:

 Aminophenols
 2-Aminophenol
 3-Aminophenol
 4-Aminophenol
 Nicotinyl alcohol
 Phenylhydroxylamine
 Vince lactam